SMK TTDI Jaya is a high school located on a plot area of 10 acres of land in Shah Alam, Selangor, Malaysia.

References

Schools in Selangor